Kigen is a surname of Kenyan origin that may refer to: meaning the awaited child male child. originally from the well known large kalenjin community known for their great excellence in long-distance running.

Mike Kigen (born 1986), Kenyan long-distance track runner and two-time African Championships medallist
Wilfred Kibet Kigen (born 1975), Kenyan marathon runner and three-time Frankfurt Marathon winner

Japan
Kigen , meaning era, origin or mood:
Dōgen Kigen (1200–1253), Japanese Zen Buddhist teacher
Mugen Kigen, single by Japanese singer-songwriter Misono
Amayo no Sanbai Kigen, late-17th century illustrated book depicting Kamigata kabuki actors 
Shin Kigen, early 20th century Japanese socialist magazine

Kalenjin names